George Stanley Halas Sr. (February 2, 1895October 31, 1983), nicknamed "Papa Bear" and "Mr. Everything", was an American professional football player, coach, and team owner. He was the founder and owner of the National Football League's Chicago Bears, and served as his own head coach on four occasions. He was also lesser-known as a Major League Baseball player for the New York Yankees.

Halas was one of the co-founders of the American Professional Football Association (now the National Football League (NFL)) in 1920, and in 1963 became one of the first 17 inductees into the Pro Football Hall of Fame. Halas was the oldest person in NFL history to serve as a head coach, as he was 72 years and 318 days old when he coached the final game of his career in December 1967, until Romeo Crennel 54 years later, who was 73 years and 115 days old when he became the interim head coach of the Houston Texans.

Early life and sports career
Halas was born in Chicago, Illinois, into a family of Czech-Bohemian immigrants. His parents, Barbara (Poledna), who ran a grocery store, and Frank Halas, a tailor, were migrants from Pilsen, Austria-Hungary. George had a varied career in sports. In 1915, Halas worked temporarily for Western Electric, and was planning on being on the SS Eastland. He was running late, however, as he was attempting to gain weight to play Big Ten football and missed the capsizing, which killed 844 passengers. After graduating from Crane High School in Chicago, he attended the University of Illinois, playing football for coach Bob Zuppke, as well as baseball and basketball, and earning a degree in civil engineering. He also became a member of Tau Kappa Epsilon fraternity. He helped Illinois win the 1918 Big Ten Conference football title.

Serving as an ensign in the Navy during World War I, he played for a team at the Great Lakes Naval Training Station, and was named the MVP of the 1919 Rose Bowl. In recognition of his Rose Bowl accomplishments, Halas was inducted into the Rose Bowl Hall of Fame in 2018. On a team which included Paddy Driscoll and Jimmy Conzelman, Halas scored a receiving touchdown and returned an intercepted pass 77 yards in a 17–0 win over the Mare Island Marines of California; the team was also rewarded with their military discharges.

Afterward, Halas played minor league baseball, eventually earning a promotion to the New York Yankees, where he played 12 games as an outfielder in 1919. However, a hip injury effectively ended his baseball career. Halas said that he was succeeded as the Yankees' right fielder by Babe Ruth, but in reality, it was Sammy Vick.  Later that year, Halas played for the Hammond Pros and received about $75 per game.

On February 18, 1922, Halas married Wilhelmina "Minnie" Bushing, to whom he remained married until her death in 1966.

Professional football career
After one year with the Pros (also known as the All-Stars), Halas moved to Decatur, Illinois to take a position with the A. E. Staley Company, a starch manufacturer. He served as a company sales representative, an outfielder on the company-sponsored baseball team, and the player-coach of the company-sponsored football team the Decatur Staleys. Halas selected his alma mater's colors—orange and navy blue—for the team's uniforms. In 1920, Halas represented the Staleys at the meeting which formed the American Professional Football Association (which became the NFL in 1922) in Canton, Ohio. After the Staleys' season ended, Halas and teammates George Trafton, Hub Shoemake, and Hugh Blacklock joined the Chicago Stayms for a December 19 match against the Chicago Cardinals, marking the only time Halas would be an NFL team's opponent for another team besides the Staleys/Bears. The game ended in a 14–14 tie.

Despite a 10–1–2 record, the Staleys ended the season awash in red ink. The Staleys' financial troubles didn't dissuade Halas from significantly upgrading the roster, to the point that it was a works team in name only. After the first game of the 1921 season, company founder and namesake Augustus E. Staley turned over control of the team to Halas so he could move the team to Chicago, where the team had attracted its biggest gates of the 1920 season. Staley gave Halas a $5,000 bonus for the move to Chicago provided that he keep the Staleys franchise name for the 1921 season. Halas then took on teammate Edward "Dutch" Sternaman as a partner.  The newly minted "Chicago Staleys" set up shop at Cubs Park, soon to be known as Wrigley Field; Halas had a good relationship with Chicago Cubs owner William Wrigley Jr. and president Bill Veeck Sr. The Staleys maneuvered their schedule to win their first NFL championship that year. The following year, Halas renamed his team the "Chicago Bears." Years later, he recalled that he wanted to find a way to choose a name that would give a nod to the Cubs. Reasoning that football players were far bigger than baseball players, he concluded, "if baseball players are cubs, then football players must be bears!"

Halas was not only the team's coach but also played end (wide receiver on offense, defensive end on defense) and handled ticket sales and the business of running the club. Named to the NFL's all-pro team in the 1920s, his playing highlight occurred in a 1923 game when he stripped Jim Thorpe of the ball, recovered the fumble, and returned it 98 yards—a league record which would stand until 1972. In 1925, Halas persuaded Illinois star player Red Grange to join the Bears; it was a significant step in establishing both the respectability and popularity of the league, which had previously been viewed as a refuge for less admirable players.

After ten seasons, Halas stepped back from the game in 1930, retiring as a player and handing coaching duties to Lake Forest Academy coach Ralph Jones; but he remained the team's owner, becoming sole owner in 1932. However, severe financial difficulties brought on by the Great Depression put the Bears in dire financial straits even though Jones led them to the NFL title in 1932. Halas returned as coach in 1933 to eliminate the additional cost of paying a head coach's salary. He coached the Bears for another ten seasons. His 1934 team was undefeated until a loss in the championship game to the New York Giants.

In the late 1930s, Halas—with University of Chicago coach Clark Shaughnessy—perfected the T-formation system to create a revolutionary and overwhelming style of play which drove the Bears to an astonishing 73–0 victory over the Washington Redskins in the 1940 NFL Championship Game—still the most lopsided margin of victory in NFL history. Every other team in the league immediately began trying to imitate the format. The Bears repeated as NFL champions in 1941, and the 1940s would be remembered as the era of the "Monsters of the Midway".

Halas and Shaughnessy had created a revolutionary concept with the T-formation offense. The complex spins, turns, fakes, and all-around athletic versatility required to execute the scheme limited the possible players available. Halas believed he'd found the perfect quarterback for his new offense in Sid Luckman, a passing star at Columbia University. Luckman was a single wing tailback; the tailback is the primary runner and passer in that scheme. Luckman launched his Hall of Fame career playing quarterback for the Bears from 1939 to 1950. Halas was not satisfied with other players who succeeded Luckman under center. During this coaching stint, he had on the Bears roster two future Hall of Fame players, Bobby Layne in 1948 and George Blanda from 1949 to 1958. Other notable players included Heisman Trophy winner Johnny Lujack from 1948 to 1951 and Zeke Bratkowski from 1954 to 1960. Blanda played in the NFL until 1975; Bratkowski moved on the Los Angeles Rams before signing with Vince Lombardi's Green Bay Packers in 1963, where he played an important role as "super sub" to starter Bart Starr in winning three straight NFL championships in 1965–'66–'67; and Bobby Layne quarterbacked the Detroit Lions to three NFL championship games between 1952 and 1954, winning two.

Halas entered the Navy again after the advent of World War II in 1942, with the rank of lieutenant commander. He served overseas for 20 months under the command of Admiral Chester Nimitz.  His duties were supporting the welfare and recreational activities of the Seventh Fleet. He was awarded the Bronze Star during his recall and released from duty in 1946 with the rank of captain. While Halas was in the Navy, the Bears won another title in 1943 under Hunk Anderson and Luke Johnsos. Returning to the field in 1946, he coached the club for a third decade, again winning a title in his first year back as coach. That same year, Halas met with the Army Chief of Staff, General Dwight Eisenhower, the Navy Chief of Staff, Admiral Chester Nimitz, and the Air Force Chief of Staff, General Carl Spaatz, and offered to set up an annual charity football game, with the Bears as hosts, whose proceeds would go to the relief agencies of the armed forces. By mid-1957, proceeds from this game were $438,350.76 and proceeds from all games the Bears participated in between 1946 and 1957 were over $2 million.

After a brief break in 1956–57, he returned as head coach for a final decade from 1958 to 1967. Despite winning his sixth and last league title in 1963, he did not enjoy the same success as he had before the war, and officially retired on May 27, 1968. He did win his 200th game in 1950 and his 300th game in 1965, becoming the first coach to reach both milestones. His six NFL Championships as a head coach is tied for the most all time with Green Bay's Curly Lambeau and later, New England's Bill Belichick.  In 40 years as a coach, he endured only six losing seasons, three of which came during his final stint.

Head coaching record

Coaching tree 
Several former players and assistant coaches of Halas have gone on to their own Head Coaching careers, and are recognized under his coaching tree:

Players who also served as assistants
 Hunk Anderson: Saint Louis (1928–1929), Notre Dame (1931–1933), NC State (1934–1936), Chicago Bears as a co-head coach (1942–1945)
 Paddy Driscoll: Marquette (1937–1940), Chicago Bears (1956–1957)
 Gene Ronzani: Newark Bears (1939–1941), Akron Bears (1946), Green Bay Packers (1950–1953)
 Luke Johnsos: Chicago Bears as a co-head coach (1942–1945)
 Joe Stydahar: Los Angeles Rams (1950–1951), Chicago Cardinals (1953–1954)
 George Wilson: Detroit Lions (1957–1964), Miami Dolphins (1966–1969)
 Bulldog Turner: New York Titans (1962)
 Babe Dimancheff: Philadelphia Bulldogs (1964–1965)
 Jim Dooley: Chicago Bears (1968–1971)
 Abe Gibron: Chicago Bears (1972–1974), Chicago Winds (1975)

Players
 Jimmy Conzelman: Rock Island Independents (1921–1922), Milwaukee Badgers (1922–1924), Detroit Panthers (1925–1926), Providence Steam Roller (1927–1929), St. Louis Gunners (1931), Washington University  (1932–1939), Chicago Cardinals (1940–1942), Chicago Cardinals (1946–1948)
 Guy Chamberlin: Canton Bulldogs (1922–1923), Cleveland Bulldogs (1924), Frankford Yellow Jackets (1925–1926), Chicago Cardinals (1927)
 Joey Sternaman: Duluth Kelleys (1923), Chicago Bulls (1926)
 Pete Stinchcomb: Columbus Tigers (1923)
 Johnny Bryan: Milwaukee Badgers (1925–1926)
 Ralph Scott: New York Yankees (1926–1927)
 Walt Kiesling: Pittsburgh Pirates/Steelers (1939–1942), Steagles as a Co-coach (1943), Card-Pitt as a Co-coach (1944), Pittsburgh Steelers (1954–1956)
 Hamp Pool: Miami Seahawks as a co-head coach (1946), Chicago Rockets (1947), Los Angeles Rams (1952–1954), Toronto Argonauts (1957–1959)
 Bob Snyder: Los Angeles Rams (1947), Toledo (1950), Calgary Stampeders (1953), Toledo Tornados (1962–1964), Wheeling Ironmen (1965–1967), Indianapolis Capitols (1968)
 Ray McLean: Lewis University (1948–1950), Green Bay Packers (1958)
 Ray Richards: Pepperdine (1949–1950), Chicago Cardinals (1955–1957)
 Mike Holovak: Boston College Eagles (1951–1959), Boston Patriots (1961–1968), New York Jets as an interim head coach (1976)
 Keith Molesworth: Baltimore Colts (1953)
 Red Conkright: Stephen F. Austin (1959–1961), Oakland Raiders (1962)
 Chuck Drulis: St. Louis Cardinals as an interim head coach (1961)
 Tom Bettis: Kansas City Chiefs as an interim head coach (1977)
 Mike Ditka: Chicago Bears (1982–1992), New Orleans Saints (1997–1999)
 Charlie Sumner: Oakland Invaders (1985)
 Richie Petitbon: Washington Redskins (1993)

Assistants
 George Allen: Los Angeles Rams (1966–1970), Washington Redskins (1971–1977), Chicago Blitz (1983), Arizona Wranglers (1984), Long Beach State (1990)
 Clark Shaughnessy*: Hawaii (1965)
 Phil Handler*
 Chuck Mather*
(*) indicates a former HC who later served as an assistant coach to Halas.

Impact on football

A pioneer both on and off the field, Halas made the Bears the first team to hold daily practice sessions, to analyze film of opponents to find weaknesses and means of attack, place assistant coaches in the press box during games, place tarp on the field, publish a club newspaper, and to broadcast games by radio. He also offered to share the team's substantial television income with teams in smaller cities, firmly believing that what was good for the league would ultimately benefit his own team. A firm disciplinarian, Halas maintained complete control of his team and did not tolerate disobedience and insubordination by players. He also insisted on absolute integrity and honesty in management, believing that a handshake was sufficient to finalize a deal; few, if any, intermediaries were necessary.

Halas's career ledger reads as follows: 63 years as an owner, 40 as a coach, 324 wins, and 8 NFL titles as a coach or owner. His 324 victories stood as an NFL record for nearly three decades, and are still far and away the most in Bears history; they are three times that of runner-up Mike Ditka. He was a charter member of the Pro Football Hall of Fame in 1963.

Other pro sports ventures

Chicago Bruins

In 1925, Halas tipped his hand in pro basketball when he helped to create the first professional basketball league in the United States – the American Basketball League – as the owner of the Chicago Bruins. The team played six seasons before folding following the 1930–31 season because of the Great Depression.

The Bruins struggled during their existence, failing to reach the playoffs in every season, but featured several notable names, including two Hall of Famers in player-coach Honey Russell and Nat Holman who played for half a season in 1926. Other notable players included Bears quarterback Laurie Walquist, Robert J. Dunne, Slim Shoun and Chicago Cardinals back Ike Mahoney.

Halas revived the team for four more seasons, 1939 to 1942, and played in the National Basketball League (NBL) and in the World Professional Basketball Tournament. This time around the Bruins were more successful, reaching the World Professional Basketball Tournament finals in 1940, losing to the Harlem Globetrotters 31–29. Notable players were Wibs Kautz, Bill Hapac and Ralph Vaughn. In their second incarnation, the team played in the Chicago Coliseum.

Newark Bears/Bombers

In 1939, Halas followed Tim Mara footsteps who purchase the Stapleton Buffaloes in 1937 and obtained the rights to a former NFL club Newark Tornadoes (now in the American Association) from Piggy Simandl, changed the team's name to Bears and stocked with talent that did not make the Chicago roster. He used the club to incubate talent and for easy return for injured players, thus making it pro football's first true farm team. Newark's most notable names included Joe Zeller as coach and Gene Ronzani who led them to the 1939 championship (with a little help in the playoff from Sid Luckman). Halas folded the team in 1941, after the Japanese attack on Pearl Harbor ushered in the United States’ participation in World War II. It would later be revived for one more season (1946) as the Newark Bombers under Halas ownership (not as a farm team), but was folded altogether at the end of the season, and was substituted by the Bloomfield Cardinals.

Akron Bears
In 1946, after he returned from service in WWII, Halas also launched the Akron Bears of the American Football League as the Chicago Bears' minor league affiliate. The launch was an attempt to interfere with the territorial rights of the Cleveland Browns, a team in the NFL rival All-America Football Conference (AAFC); Akron is located just 30 miles from Cleveland.

The team was coached again by Ronzani and had notable players like quarterback George Gulyanics, Ed Ecker, Lloyd Reese, Raymond Schumacher and Jack Karwales. The Bears were successful on the field—including reaching the league final before losing 14–13 to the Jersey City Giants—but lost at the box office a sum of $52,000, partly because they had large traveling expenses as most of the league team were located on the East Coast. The team did not return for a second season.

Honors
In both 1963 and 1965, Halas was selected by The Sporting News, the AP and the UPI as the NFL Coach of the Year. In 1997, he was featured on a U.S. postage stamp as one of the legendary coaches of football. He has been recognized by ESPN as one of the ten most influential people in sports in the 20th century, and as one of the greatest coaches. In 1993, Miami Dolphins coach Don Shula finally surpassed Halas' victory total. From the 1984 season onward to this day, the jerseys of the Chicago Bears bear the initials "GSH" on their upper left sleeves in commemoration of Halas. In 1956, Halas was awarded the Navy Distinguished Public Service Award, which is the Navy's highest civilian award.

There are two extant awards named for Halas: the George Halas Trophy (awarded by the NFL to the National Football Conference champion) and the George S. Halas Courage Award (Pro Football Writers Association). From 1966 to 1996, a George Halas Trophy was also awarded to the NFL defensive player of the year by the Newspaper Enterprise Association.

The Chicago Bears retired number 7 in his honor, and the Pro Football Hall of Fame is located on George Halas Drive.

The University of Illinois at Urbana–Champaign inducted Halas into the Engineering Hall of Fame in 2016.

Later life
After the 1967 season, Halas—then the oldest coach in league history—retired as coach. He continued as the team's principal owner for the rest of his life. Although he nominally ceded the general manager's post in 1963, he continued to make the franchise's football decisions until hiring Jim Finks as general manager in 1974. He continued to take an active role in team operations until his death. He was honored in 1970 and 1980 as the only person involved in the league throughout its first 50 and 60 years of existence. His son George, Jr. served as president of the Bears from 1963 until his sudden death at age 54 in 1979. One of Halas's final significant ownership acts was to hire Mike Ditka as head coach in 1982 (Ditka had been a Halas player in the 1960s). He had won 6 NFL championships before retiring. 

In the 1971 made-for-television film Brian's Song, about the friendship between Chicago Bears players Brian Piccolo and Gale Sayers, Halas was portrayed by Jack Warden, who won an Emmy Award for his performance.

Death

Halas died of pancreatic cancer in Chicago on October 31, 1983, at age 88, and is entombed in St. Adalbert Catholic Cemetery in Niles, Illinois. At the time of his death, he was the last surviving participant of the meeting that formed the NFL in 1920.

His eldest daughter, Virginia Halas McCaskey, succeeded him as majority owner, and her son Michael McCaskey served as team president from 1983 to 1999 at which time the elder McCaskey was forced to fire her own son. In the 1985 season when the Bears won their only Super Bowl (and post-merger NFL championship), they recorded a song called "Super Bowl Shuffle." In the song, backup quarterback Steve Fuller rhymes "Bring on Atlanta, Bring on Dallas / This is for Mike [then-current coach Mike Ditka] and Papa Bear Halas."

Super Bowl XVIII was dedicated to Halas. The pregame ceremonies featured a moment of silence and the ceremonial coin toss by former Chicago Bear Bronko Nagurski, the latter of which was previously performed by Halas for Super Bowl XIII. The missing-man formation over Tampa Stadium, performed by airplanes from MacDill Air Force Base in Tampa, Florida at the conclusion of Barry Manilow's performance of the National Anthem, was also presented in tribute to Halas.

See also
 List of National Football League head coaches with 50 wins
 List of professional gridiron football coaches with 200 wins

References

Further reading

 

 Hibner, John Charles (1993). "University of Oregon and University of Pennsylvania (1917)", in The Rose Bowl, 1902–1929: A Game-by-Game History of Football's Foremost Event, from its Advent through its Golden Era. Jefferson, NC: McFarland & Company, Inc. Publishers.
 Organized Professional Team Sports: Part 3. (password protected except at participating U.S. library) by United States House Committee on the Judiciary III, Subcommittee on Antitrust (1957). pp. 2713–2716

External links

Coaching record at Pro-Football-Reference.com

George Halas at SABR (Baseball BioProject)
George Halas Bio (Staley Museum)

1895 births
1983 deaths
Players of American football from Chicago
Baseball players from Chicago
Halas family
American football ends
Major League Baseball right fielders
Player-coaches
Chicago Bears owners
Chicago Bears executives
Chicago Bears head coaches
Chicago Bears players
Chicago Bruins
Chicago Staleys players
Decatur Staleys players
Hammond Pros players
Illinois Fighting Illini baseball players
Illinois Fighting Illini football players
Illinois Fighting Illini men's basketball players
Great Lakes Navy Bluejackets football players
New York Yankees players
St. Paul Saints (AA) players
National Basketball League (United States) owners
National Football League founders
National Football League general managers
National Football League team presidents
National Football League players with retired numbers
Pro Football Hall of Fame inductees
United States Navy officers
Recipients of the Navy Distinguished Public Service Award
United States Navy personnel of World War I
United States Navy personnel of World War II
American people of Czech descent
American people of Bohemian descent
Deaths from cancer in Illinois
Deaths from pancreatic cancer
American men's basketball players